Zhang Weiqing (born March 1944) is a Chinese politician who served as director of the National Population and Family Planning Commission from 1998 to 2008. He was a representative of the 14th, 15th, 16th, and 17th National Congress of the Chinese Communist Party. He was a member of the 15th and 16th Central Committee of the Chinese Communist Party.

Early life and education
Zhang was born in Lintong County (now Lintong District of Xi'an), Shaanxi, in March 1944. In 1963, he entered Peking University, majoring in philosophy. After university in 1968, he was sent to do farm work at the 4589 Army Farm, in Shijiazhuang, capital of Hebei.

Career in Shanxi
After a year taught primary school in Baode County, Shanxi in March 1971, he got involved in politics and became secretary of Baode County Committee of the Communist Youth League of China in March 1973. He joined the Chinese Communist Party (CCP) in June 1972. In October 1975, he became deputy party secretary of the county, rising to party secretary the next later. He was party secretary of Huguan County in August 1980, and held that office until April 1982. In August 1982, he was elevated to secretary of Shanxi Provincial Committee of the Communist Youth League of China, but having held the position for only half a year. He was appointed vice governor of Shanxi in March 1983 and two years later was admitted to member of the Standing Committee of the CCP Shanxi Provincial Committee, the province's top authority. He also served as head of the Publicity Department of the CCP Shanxi Provincial Committee from May 1985 to January 1993.

Career in Beijing
In September 1994, he was transferred to Beijing and appointed deputy director of the National Population and Family Planning Commission, and was promoted to the director position in March 1998. In December 2007, he was chosen as president of China Population Association. In March 2008, he took office as chairperson of the Population, Resources and Environment Committee of the Chinese People's Political Consultative Conference.

Publications

References

1944 births
Living people
People from Xi'an
Peking University alumni
People's Republic of China politicians from Shaanxi
Chinese Communist Party politicians from Shaanxi
Members of the 15th Central Committee of the Chinese Communist Party
Members of the 16th Central Committee of the Chinese Communist Party